Devendra Fadnavis is the current Leader of the House of the Maharashtra Legislative Council since 17 August 2022 .

Leader of the House 
The Council has a Leader of the House, who heads the government caucus. The office is provided for in the Legislative Council Rules, which defines it as "Chief Minister or any other Minister appointed by Chief Minister". The Rules further mandate that the Chairperson should conduct parliamentary business in consultation with the Leader.

Deputy Leader of The House

Subhash Desai
16 December 2019 – 29 June 2022

 Uday Samant Acting
17 August 2022 - Incumbent

See also
List of governors of Maharashtra
List of chief ministers of Maharashtra
List of Chairman of the Maharashtra Legislative Council

References

Lists of Indian politicians
Maharashtra Legislative Council